The East Berkshire Football League is a football competition based in East Berkshire, England. The league has two divisions, which used to be five until the fifth was dropped in 2013, the fourth in 2016 and the third division in 2018. The league is headed by the Premier Division. The Premier Division was a feeder to the Hellenic League but lost its step 7 status starting with the 2012–13 season. The league is now a feeder league to the Thames Valley Premier Football League.

History 
The East Berkshire Football League was formed in 2005, where there were three divisions, until the expansion in 2006 and 2009 which saw the addition of the four division in 2006, which was dropped 2016. The fifth division was added in 2009, which was dropped in 2013. In 2018, the third division was also dropped, leaving the league with three leagues until 2021, where finally the second division was dropped.

Champions

Member clubs 2022-2023

Premier Division

Division One

References

External links
Official website

 
Football leagues in England
Football in Berkshire